The effects of Hurricane Dennis in Cuba were deadly and damaging.

Background 

Dennis was formed by a tropical wave that moved off the coast of Africa on June 29. By July 2, it was organizing and on July 4, it formed as a tropical depression. It then turned west-northwest and strengthened into a tropical storm on July 5, and a hurricane on July 7th. After that, it rapidly intensified into a Category 4 hurricane before making landfall near Punta Del Ingles, Cuba on July 8. While crossing southeast Cuba, it weakened to a Category 3, before restrengthening as it reached the Gulf of Guacanayabo into a Category 4. It reached a peak intensity of  before weakening into a  storm at landfall in Punta Mangles Altos, Cuba later also on July 8.

The storm went through a period of gradual intensification before once again going through rapid intensification in the Gulf of Mexico. However, the storm soon weakened after dry air reached into the storm. It rode across the Florida Panhandle as a hurricane before weakening to a tropical storm by the time it reached southwestern Alabama. By the time it reached east-central Mississippi, it weakened to a tropical depression. It turned northeastward and moved into the Ohio Valley, where it weakened into a low pressure system. It then accelerated northeastward and eventually got absorbed into a larger low pressure system over northwestern Ontario.

Preparations 
In preparation of the storm, over 1,500,000 Cubans were forced to leave their homes, 130,000 being students and 17,000 being foreign tourists. Around 1,000 food preparing centers were stocked and 1,800 evacuation centers were activated. 140,000 people worked in life prevention and evacuation activities while 1,600 civil defense units were activated. The United Nations sent officials to Cuba to be on standby before the storm arrived.

Impact 
Over 120,000 houses were damaged in some sort of way; 15,000 had collapsed, 25,000 had been partially destroyed, 24,000 had lost their roofs, and 60,000 had some sort of roof damage. Most of the damaged houses were in the southeastern provinces of Cuba, however, many houses that had been damaged did have some sort of a structural deficiency. Several health units in the country were damaged due to high winds and rain. Floods contaminated running water; 70% of water sources in Granma alone were contaminated. To prevent the damage of electric generation stations, most were forced to halt, causing a complete failure of the countries electrical system. More than 1,000 poles were downed across the country and more than 21 counties in Cuba were still without power on July 11. Communications were also cut; in Matanzas and Cienfuegos provinces alone, 14 communication towers were down. Many roads were also blocked by things such as trees, fallen power lines, and mudslides. In Cienfuegos and Granma, almost 27,000 hectares of agriculture land was reportedly destroyed by the storm. Of the deaths, 13 of them occurred in Granma.

Aftermath 
Many families who lost their homes were forced to stay in schools that had been closed for summer break. Medical teams and clean-up brigades were formed to help the injured and clean up fallen trees and debris. Two and a half million people were left without running water, instead relying on water tankers to bring them water. America sent 100,00$ to the World Food Programme (WFP) to feed people in Granma. Japan later extended this to give enough money for 191 tons of rice. The United States offered $50,000 in aid, but Fidel Castro rejected the aid, stating he would never accept aid from the United States until the economic sanctions, in place since 1959, were dropped.

References

Hurricane Dennis
Hurricanes in Cuba
Effects of tropical cyclones